Igumnov (from игумен meaning hegumen) is a Russian masculine surname, its feminine counterpart is Igumnova. It may refer to
Gennady Igumnov (1936–2021), Russian politician
Konstantin Igumnov (1873–1948), Russian pianist 
 Vasili Igumnov (born 1987), Russian football player

See also
Igumnov House

Russian-language surnames